Blue vanga may refer to:
 Madagascar blue vanga, Cyanolanius madagascarinus
 Comoros blue vanga, Cyanolanius comorensis

Birds by common name